Prosoplus ochreobasalis is a species of beetle in the family Cerambycidae. It was described by Stephan von Breuning in 1942. It is known from the Solomon Islands.

References

Prosoplus
Beetles described in 1942